Lewis County Soldiers' and Sailors' Monument is a historic American Civil War monument located at Lowville in Lewis County, New York. It was built in 1883 by Monumental Bronze Company of Bridgeport, Connecticut, and is constructed of sand-cast zinc.  It is 20 feet high and 78 inches square and consists of five parts: a three stepped base, a plinth, a tapered column, a capital, and on the top a soldier.

It was listed on the National Register of Historic Places in 2009.

References

1883 establishments in New York (state)
1883 sculptures
Buildings and structures completed in 1883
Buildings and structures in Lewis County, New York
Monuments and memorials on the National Register of Historic Places in New York (state)
National Register of Historic Places in Lewis County, New York
Union (American Civil War) monuments and memorials in New York (state)
Zinc sculptures in the United States